The 2018–19 Hellenic Football League season was the 66th in the history of the Hellenic Football League, a football competition in England.

The provisional club allocations for steps 5 and 6 were announced by the FA on 25 May 2018. The constitution was ratified by the league at its AGM on 8 July.

Premier Division

The Premier Division featured 14 clubs which competed in the division last season, along with five new clubs:
Ardley United, promoted from Division One West
Bishop's Cleeve, relegated from the Southern League
Holmer Green, transferred from the Spartan South Midlands League
Shrivenham, promoted from Division One West
Virginia Water, promoted from Division One East

Also, Highmoor Ibis was renamed Reading City.

League table

Division One East

Division One East featured ten clubs which competed in the division last season, along with four new clubs:
Abingdon Town, promoted from Division Two East
Burnham, relegated from the Premier Division
Chalvey Sports, promoted from Division Two East
Woodley United, relegated from the Premier Division

League table

Division One West

Division One West featured nine clubs which competed in the division last season, along with five new clubs:
Almondsbury, transferred from the Western League
Carterton, promoted from Division Two West
Malmesbury Victoria, transferred from the Western League
Newent Town, promoted from Division Two West
Thornbury Town, promoted from the Gloucestershire County League

League table

Division Two East

Division Two East featured 6 clubs which competed in the division last season, along with 9 new clubs:
 Chalfont Wasps, demoted from Division One East
 Chalvey Sports reserves
 Langley
 Old Bradwell United development
 Risborough Rangers reserves
 Taplow United
 Thatcham Town development
 Wallingford Town reserves
 Yateley United

League table

Division Two West

Division Two West featured 7 clubs which competed in the division last season, along with 8 new clubs:
Abingdon Town reserves
Abingdon United development, transferred from Division Two East 
Adderbury Park, joined from the Oxfordshire Senior League
Carterton development
Headington Amateurs, demoted from Division One West
Newent Town reserves
Wantage Town  development
Woodstock Town, demoted from Division One West

League table

References

External links
 Official Site

2018–19
9